Alexander Franklin Pearson (March 9, 1877 – October 30, 1966) was a Major League Baseball pitcher who played for two seasons. He played for the St. Louis Cardinals in 1902 and the Cleveland Naps in 1903.

External links

1877 births
1966 deaths
Major League Baseball pitchers
St. Louis Cardinals players
Cleveland Naps players
Minor league baseball managers
Harrisburg Senators players
Johnstown Johnnies players
Uniontown Coal Barons players
Baltimore Orioles (IL) players
Lawrence Colts players
Lawrence Barristers players
Hartford Senators players
Baseball players from Pennsylvania